"Satellites" is the first single by Petra Marklund (performing as September) from her second album In Orbit, and is the first single released under her contract with Catchy Tunes. The single was a success in Sweden and Finland and was later released in variety of countries worldwide, such as Poland, Romania, Spain, Israel, the United Kingdom and the United States, being September's first international release.  "Satellites" is considered September's second biggest hit to date (after "Cry for You"), becoming a hit in almost all countries it was released in.

Portuguese television network SIC used the song to promote its now discontinued WAP service, SIC Música. This helped the song gain popularity in Portugal resulting in it becoming a hit, being one of the most played songs on Portuguese radio stations in 2007.

Usage in media
The song was used by Portuguese television network SIC as a promotional song for the now discontinued WAP service SIC Música. It was also used in the Portuguese show Floribella.

Critical reception
"Satellites" was well received by both critics and audience. The Swedish magazine Sonic named Satellites one of the top 15 Euro disco songs of all time. "The team of producers behind this lush dream, painted in equal parts viscos and house, have understood the genius of the eternally simple," writes their reviewer Sara Martinsson.

Music video
The music video for the song was produced by Swedish company Wreck. It was released in 2005 and is featured on the album In Orbit. It premiered on Catchy Tunes' Myspace account on 29 May 2007. The video features September dancing while wearing different colored scarves: red, yellow and orange, all wearing a white dress. The audio tracks used in the US and German versions of the video are different from the audio track found on the album: the US Mix is slightly shorter and features additional bells, the German Radio Edit is a less electronic version of the song.

Live performances
The song was performed live at Portugal's Golden Globes.

Track listings

Scandinavian CD single (CATCHY003)
 "Satellites" (Radio Edit) (3:16)
 "Satellites" (Extended) (4:34)
 "Satellites" (Electro Mix Short) (3:29)
 "Satellites" (Electro Mix Long) (4:52)

French CD single (983 458 4)
 "Satellites" (Radio Edit) (3:16)
 "Satellites" (Electro Mix Short) (3:29)
 "Satellites" (Extended) (4:34)
 "Satellites" (Electro Mix Long) (4:52)

French 12" vinyl (983 458 5)
 "Satellites" (Extended) (4:34)
 "Satellites" (Electro Mix Long) (4:52)

Italian 12" vinyl (DO IT 30-05)
 "Satellites" (Extended) (4:32)
 "Satellites" (Radio Edit) (3:13)
 "Satellites" (Electro Mix Long) (4:51)
 "Satellites" (Electro Mix Short) (3:26)

Australasian CD single (DELUXECD5003)
 "Satellites" (Radio Edit) (3:16)
 "Satellites" (Extended) (4:34)
 "Satellites" (Electro Mix Short) (3:29)
 "Satellites" (Electro Mix Long) (4:52)

US CD single (76869-72148-2)
 "Satellites" (US Mix) (3:07)
 "Satellites" (Electro Mix Edit) (3:26)
 "Satellites" (Extended Mix) (4:34)
 "Satellites" (Club Junkies Mix) (6:11)
 "Satellites" (Electro Mix) (5:52)
 "Satellites" (Clubstar Remix) (5:23)
 "Satellites" (Flip & Fill Remix) (5:45)
 "Satellites" (Dancing DJs Remix) (5:47)

UK CD single (CDGLOBE538)
 "Satellites" (Radio Edit) (3:17)
 "Satellites" (Extended Mix) (4:34)
 "Satellites" (Acoustic Mix) (3:04)
 "Satellites" (Dancing DJs Remix) (5:48)
 "Satellites" (Soul Seekerz Remix) (7:24)
 "Satellites" (Flip & Fill Remix) (5:44)
 "Satellites" (KB Project Remix) (5:53)

German CD single (0177965KON, KONTOR 577)
 "Satellites" (Radio Edit) (3:06)
 "Satellites" (International Radio Version) (3:16)
 "Satellites" (Live Acoustic Version) (3:03)
 "Satellites" (Extended) (4:34)
 "Satellites" (Electro Mix Short) (3:29)

Official versions
 Album Version/Radio Edit (3:16)
 Club Junkies Mix (6:11)
 Club Junkies Remix Radio (3:41)
 Clubstar Remix (5:23)
 Dancing DJs Remix (5:47)
 Danny D Extended Mix (6:17)
 Danny D Radio Edit Remix (3:49)
 Dave Ramone Extended (5:52) (unreleased)
 Electro Mix Long (4:52)
 Electro Mix Short (3:29)
 Extended (4:34)
 Flip & Fill Remix (5:45)
 Hard2Beat Edit (3:15)
 KB Project Remix (5:53)
 Live Acoustic Version (3:03)
 US Mix/German Radio Edit (3:06)
 Soul Seekerz Dub (7:08)
 Soul Seekerz Remix (7:24)
 The Disco Boys Remix (7:12)
 The Disco Boys Remix Radio Edit (4:19)

Release history

Charts

Weekly charts

Year-end charts

Certifications

References

2005 singles
Petra Marklund songs
Number-one singles in Poland
English-language Swedish songs
Songs written by Jonas von der Burg
Songs written by Anoo Bhagavan
2005 songs
Songs written by Niklas von der Burg